İbrala Dam is a dam in Turkey. The development was backed by the Turkish State Hydraulic Works.

See also
List of dams and reservoirs in Turkey

References

Dams in Karaman Province